Dirico Airport  is an airport near Dirico, a town in Cuando Cubango Province, Angola.

See also

 List of airports in Angola
 Transport in Angola

References

External links 
OpenStreetMap - Dirico
OurAirports - Dirico

Airports in Angola